A fibrous or muscular band is sometimes found attached, above, to the body of the hyoid bone, and below to the thyroid isthmus, or its pyramidal lobe. When muscular, it is termed the Levator muscle of thyroid gland.

References

External links
 
 

Muscles of the head and neck